Vintners Quality Alliance, or VQA, is a regulatory and appellation system which guarantees the high quality and authenticity of origin for Canadian wines made under that system in British Columbia and Ontario.  It is similar to regulatory systems in France (AOC), Spain (DO), Italy (DOC), and Germany (QmP). The VQA system allows for sub-appellations, by which the grapes for wines are sourced from extremely specific geographical locations with different soil and climate. This is in accordance with the concept of terroir.

In addition, there are other classifications of wine in Canada. British Columbia has a category known as "Wines of Distinction", Nova Scotia has "Wines of Nova Scotia" and Quebec has "Vins du Québec". All must be 100 percent made from grapes grown in British Columbia, Nova Scotia or Quebec, respectively. Cellared in Canada is a completely separate category.

Requirements

In addition to the requirements regarding sources of grapes, VQA wines may be made from Vitis vinifera grape variety and approved hybrid varieties.  In British Columbia, VQA wines are made primarily with vinifera grapes, while Ontario uses a range of vinifera varieties and notably permits the use of Vidal, particularly in the production of some of Canada's  icewines.

VQA wines may be made with grapes from relatively small agricultural yields per vine (which increases quality), they meet specific sugar or brix levels at harvest, and the use of additives is regulated. There are also standards regulating the use of certain types of packaging and closures. To receive the VQA designation, wine must undergo testing by the regulating bodies.  The VQA logo does not have a standard location on the bottle, and for some VQA wines the producer has chosen not to display the logo at all.  If a consumer wishes to purchase wine from 100% Canadian grapes, extra care must be taken to ensure that the wine is what they believe it to be, and not an "International Canadian blend" (formerly known as "Cellared in Canada").

Appellations

Ontario appellations and sub-appellations 
Total production for Ontario appellation wines is approximately 20,000 tonnes
 
 Appellation - Niagara Peninsula (includes all appellations below, Canada's largest)
Regional appellation - Niagara Escarpment (includes the 3 sub-appellations below)
Sub-appellation - Short Hills Bench
Sub-appellation - Twenty Mile Bench
Sub-appellation - Beamsville Bench
Regional appellation - Niagara-on-the-Lake (includes the 4 sub-appellations immediately below)
Sub-appellation - Niagara River
Sub-appellation - Niagara Lakeshore
Sub-appellation - Four Mile Creek
Sub-appellation - St. David's Bench
Sub-appellation - Vinemount Ridge
Sub-appellation - Creek Shores
Sub-appellation - Lincoln Lakeshore
Appellation - Lake Erie North Shore
Sub-appellation - South Islands
 Appellation - Prince Edward County

In addition, the Ontario Wine Appellation Authority recognizes the following emerging regions, which are not yet recognized as official appellations:

 Norfolk and Haldimand Counties
 Central Ontario and Georgian Bay
 Huron Shores
 Eastern Ontario

British Columbia geographical indications (appellations) 
(total production for 2012 27,000+ tons)

 GI - Fraser Valley
 GI - Gulf Islands
 GI - Kootenays
 GI - Lillooet
 GI - Okanagan Valley
 Sub-GI - East Kelowna Slopes
 Sub-GI - Golden Mile Bench
 Sub-GI - Golden Mile Slopes
 Sub-GI - Lake Country
 Sub-GI - Okanagan Falls
 Sub-GI - Naramata Bench
 Sub-GI - Skaha Bench
 Sub-GI - South Kelowna Slopes
 Sub-GI - Summerland Bench
 Sub-GI - Summerland Lakefront
 Sub-GI - Summerland Valleys
 GI - Shuswap
 GI - Similkameen Valley
 GI - Thompson Valley
 GI - Vancouver Island
 Sub-GI - Cowichan Valley

Organizations

Regulatory
 British Columbia Wine Institute (the regulatory role is being transferred to the new British Columbia Wine Authority, which will be a government body).
 Vintners Quality Alliance Ontario, which is a regulatory agency of the Province of Ontario that administers the Ontario VQA Act.

Marketing & Advocacy
 British Columbia Wine Institute
 Wine Council of Ontario
 Winery Association of Nova Scotia
 Vignerons independants du Quebec

Other organizations
 B.C. Grape Growers Association (represent independent growers).
 Association of B.C. Winegrowers (represents smaller and fruit wineries).
 Grape Growers of Ontario (represent growers and negotiate the prices of grapes).
 Ontario Wine Producers Association

References

External links
  VQA Ontario
  British Columbia Wine Institute
  Wines of Ontario
  Wines of Nova Scotia

Canadian wine
Wine classification
Alcohol in Ontario
Alcohol in British Columbia